12th Five Year Plan of the Government of India (2012–17) was India's last Five Year Plan.

With the deteriorating global situation, the Deputy Chairman of the Planning Commission Mr Montek Singh Ahluwalia has said that achieving an average growth rate of 8 per cent in the next five years is not possible. The final growth target has been set at 8% by the endorsement of plan at the National Development Council (NDC) meeting held in New Delhi.

"It is not possible to think of an average of 9 per cent (in 12th Plan). I think somewhere between 8 and 8.5 per cent is feasible", Mr Ahluwalia said on the sidelines of a conference of State Planning Boards and departments. The approached paper for the 12th Plan, approved last year, talked about an annual average growth rate of 9 per cent.

"When I say feasible...that will require major effort. If you don't do that, there is no God given right to grow at 8 per cent. I think given that the world economy deteriorated very sharply over the last year...the growth rate in the first year of the 12th Plan (2012-13) is 6.5 to 7 per cent."

He also indicated that soon he would share his views with other members of the commission to choose a final number (economic growth target) to put before the country's NDC for its approval.

Though the 12th Plan has taken off, it is yet to be formally approved. The Planning Commission set a deadline of September for taking the approval of the NDC. The council is expected to meet after July, subject to the convenience of the Prime Minister. It is mainly focused on health. The status of the 12th Plan is in question due to the dissolution of the Planning Commission.

Poverty

The government intends to reduce poverty by 10 per cent during the 12th Five-Year Plan. Mr Ahluwalia said, "We aim to reduce poverty estimates by 2 per cent annually on a sustainable basis during the Plan period".

According to the Tendulkar methodology, the percentage of population below the poverty line was 29.8 per cent at the end of 2009–10. This number includes 33.8 per cent in the rural areas and 20.9 per cent in the urban areas.

Earlier, addressing a conference of State Planning Boards and Planning departments, he said the rate of decline in poverty doubled during the 11th Plan. The commission had said, while using the Tendulkar poverty line, the rate of reduction in the five years between 2004–05 and 2009–10, was about 1.5 percentage points each year, which was twice that when compared to the period between 1993–95 to 2004–05.

See also
 Five-Year Plans of India

References

Five-year plans of India
2012 in India
2010s in India